The Israeli Communist Party, commonly known by its Hebrew acronym Maki, is a communist political party in Israel and forms part of the political alliance known as Hadash. It was originally known as Rakah, an acronym for Reshima Komunistit Hadasha ("New Communist List"), after breaking away from the original Maki in the 1960s.

History

Rakah was formed on 1 September 1965 due to internal disagreements in Maki. Maki, the original Israeli Communist Party, saw a split between a largely Jewish and Zionist faction led by Moshe Sneh, which was critical of the Soviet Union's increasingly anti-Zionist stance, and a largely Arab faction, which was increasingly anti-Zionist. 

As a result, the pro-Arab/pro-Soviet faction (including Emile Habibi, Tawfik Toubi and Meir Vilner) left Maki to form a new party, Rakah, which the Soviet Union recognised as the "official" Communist Party. Shlomo Sand and Mahmoud Darwish were also Rakah activists. 

The Eurocommunist faction, led by Sneh, remained in Maki. It was reported in the Soviet media that the Mikunis–Sneh group defected to the bourgeois-nationalist camp.

The 1965 elections saw Rakah party win three seats, comprehensively beating Maki as it slumped to just one. Rakah's opposition to Zionism and the Six-Day War meant they were excluded from the national unity governments of the sixth Knesset. In the 1969 elections Rakah again won three seats. During the 1973 elections Rakah saw a rise in support as the party picked up four seats.

Before the 1977 elections the party joined with some other small left-wing and Arab parties, including some members of the Israeli Black Panthers to form Hadash. After the original Maki had disappeared after merging into Ratz in 1981, members of Rakah decided to change the party's name to Maki in 1989. The party remains the leading force in Hadash, and owns the Al-Ittihad newspaper.

Election results

References

External links

Arab political parties in Israel
Political parties in Israel
Communist parties in Israel
Political parties established in 1965
1965 establishments in Israel
International Meeting of Communist and Workers Parties